Charles Oldaker (1887 – 26 September 1915) was a British gymnast. He competed in the men's team event at the 1908 Summer Olympics. He was killed in action during World War I.

Personal life
Oldaker served as a lance sergeant in the Worcestershire Regiment during the First World War. He was killed in action on 26 September 1915 in the area of Givenchy-lès-la-Bassée. Oldaker's body was not recovered, and he is commemorated at Loos Memorial.

See also
 List of Olympians killed in World War I

References

1887 births
1915 deaths
British male artistic gymnasts
Olympic gymnasts of Great Britain
Gymnasts at the 1908 Summer Olympics
Sportspeople from Smethwick
Worcestershire Regiment soldiers
British military personnel killed in World War I
British Army personnel of World War I
Military personnel from Staffordshire